Francesco de' Notari, O.M. (died 1652) was a Roman Catholic prelate who served as Bishop of Lavello (1644–1652).

Biography
Francesco de' Notari  was born in Naples, Italy, and ordained a priest in the Order of Minims.
On 13 July 1644, he was appointed during the papacy of Pope Urban VIII as Bishop of Lavello.
On 17 July 1644, he was consecrated bishop by Ciriaco Rocci, Cardinal-Priest of San Salvatore in Lauro, with Alfonso Sacrati, Bishop Emeritus of Comacchio, and Francesco Maria Spinola, Bishop of Savona, serving as co-consecrators. 
He served as Bishop of Lavello until his death in 1652.

While bishop, he was the principal co-consecrator of Jacobus Wemmers, Titular Bishop of Memphis (1645).

References

External links and additional sources
 (Chronology of Bishops) 
 (Chronology of Bishops) 

17th-century Italian Roman Catholic bishops
Bishops appointed by Pope Urban VIII
1652 deaths